{{DISPLAYTITLE:Pi1 Gruis}}

π1 Gruis (Pi1 Gruis)  is a semiregular variable star in the constellation Grus around 530 light-years from Earth.  It forms a close naked-eye double with π2 Gru four arc-minutes away.

π1 Gruis is an asymptotic giant branch (AGB) star of spectral type S5. It is one of the brightest members of a class of stars known as S stars. It is also a semi-regular variable star ranging from apparent magnitude 5.3 to 7.0 over a period of 198.8 days. It is an ageing star, thought to be well on its way transitioning from a red giant to a planetary nebula. A shell of material has been detected at a distance of 0.91 light-years (0.28 parsecs), which is estimated to have been ejected 21,000 years ago. Closer to the star, there appears to be a cavity within , suggesting a drop off in the ejection of material in the past 90 years. The presence of one companion makes the shape of the shell irregular (rather than spherical), and there may as yet be another undetected companion contributing to this.

π1 Gruis has a companion star of apparent magnitude 10.9 that is sunlike in properties—a yellow main sequence star of spectral type G0V. The primary star has a measured diameter of 18.37 milliarcseconds, corresponding to a size 350 times that of the Sun.

The star was catalogued by French explorer and astronomer Nicolas Louis de Lacaille in 1756 but not given a name. Instead, he gave the Bayer designation of "π Gruis" to π2. It was Thomas Brisbane who designated this star as π1. Annie Jump Cannon was the first to report its unusual spectrum, sending a plate of its spectrograph made in 1895 to Paul W. Merrill and noting its similarity to R Andromedae. Merrill selected these two stars along with R Cygni to be the three prototypes of the S star class. π1 Gruis was one of the first 17 stars defined as S-stars by Merrill in 1922; the only star not observed from Mount Wilson due to its southerly location in the sky. Analysis of its spectrum showed bands indicating the presence of technetium, as well as oxides of zirconium, lanthanum, cerium and yttrium but not titanium nor barium which have been recorded in other S stars.

References

Grus (constellation)
Gruis, Pi1
S-type stars
G-type main-sequence stars
110478
8521
212087
Durchmusterung objects
Semiregular variable stars
Asymptotic-giant-branch stars
Binary stars